The 2007 Pro Bowl was the National Football League's all-star game for the 2006 season. The game took place on February 10, 2007, at Aloha Stadium in Honolulu, Hawaii. The game was held on a Saturday instead of the usual Sunday after the Super Bowl because of a request by broadcaster CBS.
The 2007 Pro Bowl marked the 28th consecutive time that the National Football League's all-star game was held in Honolulu. The NFC was coached by Sean Payton of the New Orleans Saints. The AFC was coached by Bill Belichick of the New England Patriots.

AFC quarterback Carson Palmer was selected as the Most Valuable Player of the game. This Pro Bowl is mainly remembered for Sean Taylor's big hit on Buffalo Bills punter Brian Moorman.

Scoring summary
1st Quarter
None.
2nd Quarter 
NFC – Tiki Barber 1-yard run (Robbie Gould kick), 12:24. NFC 7–0. Drive: 9 plays, 67 yards, 10:40.
AFC – Reggie Wayne 72-yard pass from Carson Palmer (Nate Kaeding kick), 11:19. Tied 7–7. Drive: 4 plays, 74 yards, 1:05.
AFC – Adalius Thomas 70-yard fumble return (Nate Kaeding kick), 7:42. AFC 14–7.
NFC – Frank Gore 1-yard run (Gould kick), 4:09. Tied 14–14. Drive: 7 plays, 53 yards, 3:33.
3rd Quarter
AFC – LaDainian Tomlinson 3-yard run (Nate Kaeding kick), 9:36. AFC 21–14. Drive: 9 plays, 57 yards, 5:19.
4th Quarter
AFC – Chad Johnson 42-yard pass from Palmer (Nate Kaeding kick), 12:47. AFC 28–14. Drive: 3 plays, 71 yards, 1:24.
NFC – Steven Jackson 4-yard run (Failed 2 pt. conversion pass from Tony Romo), 2:52. AFC 28–20. Drive: 4 plays, 11 yards, 1:25.
NFC – Anquan Boldin 47-yard pass from Tony Romo (S. Smith 2 pt. conversion pass from Tony Romo), 1:48. Tied 28–28. Drive: 4 plays, 58 yards, 1:04.
AFC – Nate Kaeding 21-yard FG, 0:00. AFC 31–28. Drive: 7 plays, 63 yards, 1:48.

AFC roster

Offense

Defense

Special teams

NFC roster

Offense

Defense

Special teams

Notes:
Replacement selection due to injury or vacancy
Injured player; selected but did not play
Replacement starter; selected as reserve
"Need player"; named by coach
Tom Brady was first alternate, but he declined

Number of selections by team
 11 selections:
 San Diego Chargers
 8 selections:
 Chicago Bears
 7 selections:
  Dallas Cowboys, Baltimore Ravens
 5 selections:
 Indianapolis Colts
 4 selections:
 Kansas City Chiefs, Minnesota Vikings, Pittsburgh Steelers, Seattle Seahawks
 3 selections:
 San Francisco 49ers, Carolina Panthers, Cincinnati Bengals, Denver Broncos, New Orleans Saints, Philadelphia Eagles, St. Louis Rams, New York Giants, Tampa Bay Buccaneers
 2 selections:
 Arizona Cardinals, Atlanta Falcons, Buffalo Bills, Green Bay Packers, Jacksonville Jaguars, Miami Dolphins, New England Patriots, Washington Redskins
 1 selection:
 Tennessee Titans, Houston Texans, New York Jets, Oakland Raiders, Detroit Lions
No selections:
 Cleveland Browns

Officials
 Referee: Larry Nemmers
 Umpire: Chad Brown
 Head Linesman: Ron Phares
 Line Judge: Tom Barnes
 Field Judge: Tom Sifferman
 Side Judge: Doug Toole
 Back Judge: Richard Reels
 Alternate: Walt Coleman

2007 Pro Bowl Cheerleading Squad

AFC
Leslie Anderson, Baltimore Ravens
Aimee, Buffalo Bills
Deanna Hazeley, Cincinnati Bengals
Holly Flahery, Denver Broncos
Tiffany Engelking, Houston Texans
Kristie Minton, Indianapolis Colts
Amy Froemming, Jacksonville Jaguars
Shanna Hill, Kansas City Chiefs
Jaime Edmondson, Miami Dolphins
Briana Lee, New England Patriots
Megan Myers, Oakland Raiders
Stacie Gazonas, San Diego Chargers
Jennifer Hill, Tennessee Titans
Brooke Bodnar, New York Jets

NFC
Brooke Castaneda, Arizona Cardinals
Jamie Ratliff, Atlanta Falcons
Kelly Randazzo, Carolina Panthers
Megan Fox, Dallas Cowboys
Stephanie Baker, Minnesota Vikings
Kristen Aucoin, New Orleans Saints
Amanda Wynn, Philadelphia Eagles
Janelle Delgado, San Francisco 49ers
Colleen Murphy, Seattle Seahawks
Erin Donnelly, St. Louis Rams
Jessica Diaz, Tampa Bay Buccaneers
Kimberly Linberger, Washington Redskins

References

Sources

External links

 2007 AFC Pro Bowl roster
 2007 NFC Pro Bowl roster

Pro Bowl
Pro Bowl
Pro Bowl
Pro Bowl
Pro Bowl
American football competitions in Honolulu
February 2007 sports events in the United States